This is a categorised list of places in the principal area of Denbighshire, north Wales. See the list of places in Wales for places in other principal areas.

Administrative divisions

Electoral wards
See the article on electoral wards for an explanation of this list.

Communities
This is a list of local communities:

See also
List of places in Denbighshire

Denbighshire